Avalukkenna Azhagiya Mugam is a 2018 Indian Tamil-language romantic comedy film directed by Kesavan and starring newcomers Poovarasan, Anupama Prakash, Vicky Adhithyan, Siva, Vijay Karthick, Sathya, Nivisha and Rupashree.

Cast 

Poovarasan as Krishna
Anupama Prakash as Kavya
Vicky Adhithyan as Arivazhagan
Siva as Sabari
Vijay Karthick as Ragavan
Sathya as Sunitha
Nivisha
Rupashree
Yogi Babu
Ravi Venkataraman
Powerstar Srinivasan
T. P. Gajendran
Subbu Panchu
Anu Mohan
Pandu
Pondy Ravi
Sampath Ram
Indhu Ravi
 Vengal Rao
'Boys' Rajan
Nellai Siva
Subbaraj

Production 
Director Kesavan previously worked as an assistant to Kathir and Kalanjiyam. The film's title is based on a song from Server Sundaram (1964). The film has four different romantic stories intertwined together. The film was initially conceived as a short film and was almost done shooting in March of 2015.

Reception 
A critic from The Times of India wrote that "The movie, which is tipped as a romantic entertainer, doesn't offer anything which is required to impress the viewers". A critic from Cinema Express wrote that "If not for the bad romance in this romcom, Avalukkenna Azhagiya Mugam may have been far better". A critic from Times of India Samayam positively reviewed several aspects of the film.

References

External links 
 

2010s Tamil-language films

Indian romantic comedy films
2010s romantic comedy films